Little Boulder Creek is an eastward-flowing stream in the Santa Cruz Mountains of California.  Rising in Santa Cruz County near Big Basin Redwoods State Park, it crosses into San Mateo County and empties into Pescadero Creek.

References

See also
List of watercourses in the San Francisco Bay Area

Rivers of San Mateo County, California
Rivers of Santa Cruz County, California
Rivers of Northern California
Tributaries of Pescadero Creek